Sympycnodes tripartita is a species of moth of the family Cossidae. It is found in Australia, where it has been recorded from northern New South Wales to southern Queensland where it occurs at altitudes up to 1,000 meters.

The wingspan is 33–49 mm for males and 65 mm for females. The forewings are covered in off-white scales with numerous groups of dark strigulae (fine streaks) and two triangular markings on the costa, as well as white and brown marks along the tornus and termen. The hindwings are fuscous with faint strigulae. Adults have been recorded on wing from December to the beginning of April.

References

Moths described in 1892
Zeuzerinae